Mital Baltabayevich Sharipov (born 13 April 1972 in Frunze) is a retired Kyrgyzstani weightlifter. Sharipov represented Kyrgyzstan at the 2000 Summer Olympics in Sydney, where he competed in the men's light heavyweight class. He successfully lifted 155 kg in the single-motion snatch, and hoisted 190 kg in the two-part, shoulder-to-overhead clean and jerk to deliver a sixteenth-place finish in a field of twenty weightlifters with a total of 345 kg. At the 2004 Summer Olympics in Athens, Sharipov was appointed as the Kyrgyzstani flag bearer in the opening ceremony, but has been immediately excluded by the International Olympic Committee for violations on anti-doping rules.

References

External links
 

1972 births
Living people
Kyrgyzstani male weightlifters
Olympic weightlifters of Kyrgyzstan
Weightlifters at the 2000 Summer Olympics
Sportspeople from Bishkek
Kyrgyzstani people of Russian descent
Asian Games medalists in weightlifting
Weightlifters at the 1994 Asian Games
Weightlifters at the 1998 Asian Games
Weightlifters at the 2002 Asian Games
Asian Games bronze medalists for Kyrgyzstan
Medalists at the 1994 Asian Games
20th-century Kyrgyzstani people
21st-century Kyrgyzstani people